Wilfredo Chiesa (born 1952 in San Juan, Puerto Rico) is a Puerto Rican artist.

He studied at the Escuela de Artes Plásticas y Diseño de Puerto Rico, where he received a BFA in Painting in 1972. In the late 1970s he moved to Massachusetts; in 1979, he became a professor at University of Massachusetts Boston.

Collections
Lowe Art Museum, Miami
Museo de Historia, Antropología y Arte, Puerto Rico
Frost Art Museum, Miami
Museum of Fine Arts, Boston
Museo de Arte de Puerto Rico

References

1952 births
People from San Juan, Puerto Rico
Puerto Rican artists
Living people